Luis Renato Panay Pérez (4 November 1922 – unknown), known as Renato Panay, was a Chilean football manager.

Career

Club
Panay had a prolific career in South America and Panama. In Ecuador, he coached Emelec three times: 1948, 1954, 1956. In 1948 he led the team in the South American Championship of Champions, an older version of Copa Libertadores.

In Chile, he had two steps with Rangers de Talca in 1957 and 1960.

In Bolivia, he coached San José (1959, 1969–70), Jorge Wilstermann (1960–61), and Aurora (1963–64). Along with San José, he got the 1959 Campeonato Nacional Integrado. With Aurora, he won the 1963 Bolivian Primera División.

In Venezuela, he coached Zulia, becoming the first Chilean manager in the Venezuelan football.

National team
In 1961 he led the Bolivia national team in the 1962 FIFA World Cup qualifiers versus Uruguay, with a 1-1 draw in La Paz and a 1-2 loss in Montevideo. A month before, he had joined the Brazilian club America-RJ, but he just stayed two days with it. 

In the 1970s he emigrated to Panama and coached the national team, becoming one of the five Chileans who have managed it along with Óscar Rendoll Gómez (1946–47/1951–52), Óscar Suman (1949), Néstor Valdés (1969–70) and Hugo Tassara (1972–1973). He led the team in its first FIFA World Cup qualification for the 1978 FIFA World Cup. At the championship, he made his debut with a 3-2 win versus Costa Rica in the Estadio Revolución on 4 April 1976.  Previously he had led the national team in both the 1972 Pre-Olympic Tournament and the 1974 Central American and Caribbean Games with amateur squads.

Personal life

He made his home and died in Panama.

Honours
Emelec
 : 

San José
 Campeonato Nacional Integrado: 1959

Aurora
 Bolivian Primera División: 1963

References

External links
 

1922 births
Date of death missing
Chilean football managers
C.S. Emelec managers
Rangers de Talca managers
Club San José managers
C.D. Jorge Wilstermann managers
America Football Club (RJ) managers
Bolivia national football team managers
Club Aurora managers
Zulia F.C. managers
Panama national football team managers
Chilean Primera División managers
Campeonato Brasileiro Série A managers
Bolivian Primera División managers
Venezuelan Primera División managers
Chilean expatriate football managers
Chilean expatriate sportspeople in Ecuador
Chilean expatriate sportspeople in Bolivia
Chilean expatriate sportspeople in Brazil
Chilean expatriate sportspeople in Venezuela
Chilean expatriate sportspeople in Panama
Expatriate football managers in Ecuador
Expatriate football managers in Bolivia
Expatriate football managers in Brazil
Expatriate football managers in Venezuela
Expatriate football managers in Panama
Place of birth missing
Place of death missing